Fairfax County, officially the County of Fairfax, is a county in the Commonwealth of Virginia. It is part of Northern Virginia and borders both the city of Alexandria and Arlington County and forms part of the suburban ring of Washington, D.C. The county is predominantly suburban in character with some urban and rural pockets.

As of the 2020 census, the population was 1,150,309, making it Virginia's most populous jurisdiction, with around 13% of the Commonwealth's population. The county is also the most populous jurisdiction in the Washington-Arlington-Alexandria, DC-VA-MD-WV Metropolitan Statistical Area, with around 20% of the MSA population, as well as the larger Washington-Baltimore-Arlington, DC-MD-VA-WV-PA Combined Statistical Area, with around 13% of the CSA population. The county seat is Fairfax, although because it is an independent city under Virginia law, the city of Fairfax is not part of Fairfax County.

Fairfax was the first U.S. county to reach a six-figure median household income and has the third-highest median household income of any county-level local jurisdiction in the U.S. Fairfax County, as part of the Washington, D.C. metropolitan area, is usually included atop or near the top of lists of the wealthiest areas in the United States.

The county is home to the headquarters of several intelligence agencies such as the Central Intelligence Agency, National Geospatial-Intelligence Agency, National Reconnaissance Office, National Counterterrorism Center, and Office of the Director of National Intelligence as well as the headquarters of several aerospace manufacturing and defense industry giants. The county is also home to the flagship campus of George Mason University, and headquarters to seven Fortune 500 companies, including three in the Falls Church area, though not in the independent municipality of Falls Church.

History 

At the time of first European encounter, the inhabitants of what would become Fairfax County were an Algonquian-speaking subgroup called the Taux, also known as the Doeg or Dogue. Their villages, as recorded by Captain John Smith in 1608, included Namassingakent and Nemaroughquand on the south bank of the Potomac River in what is now Fairfax County. Virginian colonists from the Northern Neck region drove the Doeg out of this area and into Maryland by 1670.

Fairfax County was formed in 1742 from the northern part of Prince William County. It was named after Thomas Fairfax, 6th Lord Fairfax of Cameron (1693–1781), proprietor of the Northern Neck. The Fairfax family name is derived from the Old English phrase for "blond hair", Fæger-feax.

The oldest settlements in Fairfax County were along the Potomac River. George Washington settled in Fairfax County and built his home, Mount Vernon, facing the river. Gunston Hall, the home of George Mason, is nearby. Modern Fort Belvoir is partly on the estate of Belvoir Manor, built along the Potomac by William Fairfax in 1741.

Thomas Fairfax, the only member of the British nobility ever to reside in the colonies, lived at Belvoir before moving to the Shenandoah Valley. The Belvoir mansion and several of its outbuildings were destroyed by fire immediately after the Revolutionary War in 1783, and George Washington noted the plantation complex deteriorated into ruins.

In 1757, the northwestern two-thirds of Fairfax County became Loudoun County. In 1789, part of Fairfax County was ceded to the federal government to form Alexandria County of the District of Columbia. Alexandria County was returned to Virginia in 1846, reduced in size by the secession of the independent city of Alexandria in 1870, and renamed Arlington County in 1920. The Fairfax County town of Falls Church became an independent city in 1948. The Fairfax County town of Fairfax became an independent city in 1961.

Located near Washington, D.C., Fairfax County was an important region in the Civil War. The Battle of Chantilly or Ox Hill, during the same campaign as the second Battle of Bull Run, was fought within the county; Bull Run is the border between Fairfax and Prince William Counties. Other areas of activity included Minor's Hill, Munson's Hill, and Upton's Hill, on the county's eastern border, overlooking Washington, D.C.

The federal government's growth during and after World War II spurred rapid growth in the county and made it increasingly suburban. Other large businesses continued to settle in Fairfax County and the opening of Tysons Corner Center spurred the rise of Tysons Corner. The technology boom and a steady government-driven economy also created rapid growth and an increasingly large and diverse population. The economy has also made Fairfax County one of the nation's wealthiest counties.

A general aviation airport along U.S. Route 50 west of Seven Corners called the Falls Church Airpark operated in the county from 1948 to 1960. The facility's 2,650-foot unpaved runway was used extensively by private pilots and civil defense officials. Residential development, multiple accidents, and the demand for retail space led to its closure in 1960.

Geography 

Fairfax County is bounded on the north and southeast by the Potomac River. Across the river to the northeast is Washington, D.C., across the river to the north is Montgomery County, Maryland, and across the river to the southeast are Prince George's County, Maryland and Charles County, Maryland. The county is partially bounded on the north and east by Arlington County and the independent cities of Alexandria and Falls Church. It is bounded on the west by Loudoun County, and on the south by Prince William County.

Most of the county lies in the Piedmont region, with rolling hills and deep stream valleys such as Difficult Run and its tributaries. West of Route 28, the hills give way to a flat, gentle valley that stretches west to the Bull Run Mountains in Loudoun County. Elevations in the county range from near sea level along the tidal sections of the Potomac River in the southeast portion of the county to more than 500 feet (150 m) in the Tysons Corner area.

Adjacent jurisdictions

Geology 
The Piedmont hills in the central county are made up of ancient metamorphic rocks such as schist, the roots of several ancestral ranges of the Appalachians. The western valley is floored with more recent shale and sandstone. This geology is similar to adjacent bands of rocks in Maryland and further south in Virginia along the eastern front of the Appalachians.

Much of the asbestos is known to emanate from fibrous tremolite or actinolite. The threat was discovered in 1987, prompting the county to establish laws to monitor air quality at construction sites, control soil taken from affected areas, and require freshly developed sites to lay  of clean, stable material over the ground.

For instance, during the construction of Centreville High School a large amount of asbestos-laden soil was removed and then trucked to Vienna for the construction of the I-66/Nutley Street interchange. Fill dirt then had to be trucked in to make the site level. Marine clays can be found in widespread areas of the county east of Interstate 95, mostly in the Lee and Mount Vernon districts. These clays contribute to soil instability, leading to significant construction challenges for builders.

Government and politics

Fairfax County uses the urban county executive form of government, which county voters approved in a 1966 referendum.

Under the urban county executive plan, the county is governed by the 10-member Fairfax County Board of Supervisors with the day-to-day running of the county tasked to the appointed Fairfax County executive.

Nine of the board members are elected from the single-member districts of Braddock, Dranesville, Franconia, Hunter Mill, Mason, Mount Vernon, Providence, Springfield, and Sully, while the chairman is elected at-large.

In addition to the Board of Supervisors, three constitutional officers—the commonwealth's attorney, clerk of the Circuit Court and sheriff—and the 12 members of the Fairfax County School Board are directly elected by the voters of Fairfax County.

The Fairfax County Government Center is west of the City of Fairfax in an unincorporated area. Fairfax County contains an exclave unincorporated area in the City of Fairfax's central business district, where many county facilities (including the courthouses and jail) are.

Fairfax County was once considered a Republican bastion, but in recent years Democrats have made significant inroads, gaining control of the Board of Supervisors and the School Board (officially nonpartisan) as well as the offices of sheriff and Commonwealth attorney. Democrats also hold all the Fairfax seats in the Virginia House of Delegates and every seat in the Senate.

Fairfax County encompasses parts of three congressional districts, the 8th District, the 10th District, and the 11th District. Democrats represent all three districts, with Jennifer Wexton representing the 10th, Don Beyer representing the 8th, and Gerry Connolly representing the 11th.

Communities closer to Washington, D.C., generally favor Democrats by a larger margin than outlying communities. In elections in 2000, 2001, and 2005, Fairfax County supported Democrats for U.S. Senate and governor. In 2004, Democratic presidential nominee John Kerry won the county, becoming the first Democrat to do so since Lyndon B. Johnson in 1964 (the last time Democrats carried the state until 2008). Kerry defeated George W. Bush in the county, 53% to 46%.

Democratic gubernatorial candidate Tim Kaine carried Fairfax County with over 60% of the vote in 2005, helping him win 51.7% of the statewide vote. In 2006, U.S. Senate candidate Jim Webb carried the county with 58.9% of the vote while winning the statewide election.

In the state and local elections of November 2007, Fairfax Democrats picked up one seat in the House of Delegates, two seats in the Senate, and one seat on the Board of Supervisors, making their majority there 8–2.

On November 4, 2008, Fairfax County continued its shift towards the Democrats, with Barack Obama and Mark Warner each garnering over 60% of the vote for president and U.S. Senate, respectively. Also, the Fairfax-anchored 11th District United States House of Representatives seat held by Thomas M. Davis for 14 years was won by Gerry Connolly, the Democratic chairman of the Fairfax County Board of Supervisors.

Braddock supervisor Sharon Bulova won a special election on February 3, 2009, to succeed Connolly as chairman of the Board of Supervisors, continuing a Democratic hold on the office that dates to 1995. Delegate David Marsden won a special election on January 12, 2010, to succeed Ken Cuccinelli in the 37th State Senate district. Fairfax County is now represented in the Virginia State Senate by an all-Democratic delegation.

In the 2010 congressional elections, Republican challenger Keith Fimian nearly won the election for the 11th District seat, losing to Connolly by 981 votes out of over 225,000 cast (a margin of 0.4%). Jim Moran and Frank Wolf were reelected, 61%–37% and 63%–35%, respectively.

In 2012, Fairfax County solidly backed Obama for reelection as president, as he nearly matched his 2008 performance, winning the county 59.6% to 39.1%. Former Governor Tim Kaine, running for the U.S. Senate in 2012, carried Fairfax County with 61% of the vote as part of his statewide victory. Representatives Connolly, Moran, and Wolf were also reelected.

Although Republican governor Bob McDonnell won Fairfax County with 51% of the vote in 2009, the Republican resurgence in Fairfax was short-lived. In the 2013 election, Democratic gubernatorial candidate Terry McAuliffe won Fairfax County with 58% of the vote, defeating incumbent state attorney general and former Republican state senator from Fairfax Ken Cuccinelli. McAuliffe's running mates, Ralph Northam and Mark Herring, also carried Fairfax County in their respective bids for lieutenant governor and attorney general. These Democratic victories mirrored the Democratic ticket's sweep of the state's three executive offices for the first time since 1989.

In the 2016 general election, Fairfax continued its trend towards Democratic candidates. Representatives Beyer and Connolly were reelected, the latter unopposed. Fairfax County supported Hillary Clinton for president with 64.4% of the vote to Donald Trump's 28.6%, exemplifying a heavy swing toward Democrats across Northern Virginia.

In 2020, Democratic presidential nominee Joe Biden won the county with 69.89% of the vote, the best percentage for a Democrat in the county since 1916.

Demographics

2020 census

Note: the US Census treats Hispanic/Latino as an ethnic category. This table excludes Latinos from the racial categories and assigns them to a separate category. Hispanics/Latinos can be of any race.

2010 census
As of 2010, there were 1,081,726 people, 350,714 households, and 250,409 families residing in the county. The ethnic makeup of the county was:

The largest ancestry groups were:

In 2000, there were 350,714 households, of which 36.30% had children under the age of 18 living with them, 59.40% were married couples living together, 8.60% had a female householder with no husband present, and 28.60% were non-families. 21.40% of all households were made up of individuals, and 4.80% had someone living alone who was 65 years of age or older. The average household size was 2.74 and the average family size was 3.20.

The age distribution was 25.40% under the age of 18, 7.50% from 18 to 24, 33.90% from 25 to 44, 25.30% from 45 to 64, and 7.90% who were 65 years of age or older. The median age was 36 years. For every 100 females, there were 98.60 males. For every 100 females age 18 and over, there were 96.20 males.

The median income for a household in the county was $81,050, and the median income for a family was $92,146; in a 2007 estimate, these figures rose to $102,460 and $120,804, respectively. Males had a median income of $60,503 versus $41,802 for females. The per capita income for the county was $36,888. About 3.00% of families and 4.50% of the population were below the poverty line, including 5.20% of those under age 18 and 4.00% of those age 65 or over. A more recent report from the 2007 American Community Survey indicated that poverty in Fairfax County, Virginia had risen to 4.9%.

Judged by household median income, Fairfax County is among the highest-income counties in the country, and was first on that list for many years. In the 2000 census, it was overtaken by Douglas County, Colorado. According to 2005 U.S. Census Bureau estimates, it had the second-highest median household income behind neighboring Loudoun County, at $94,610. In 2007, Fairfax County reclaimed its position as the richest county in America, in addition to becoming the first county in American history to have a median household income over $100,000, though not the first jurisdiction. In 2008, Loudoun County reclaimed the top position, with Fairfax County a statistically insignificant second. In 2012, Fairfax County's median household income was $108,439.

Fairfax County males have the highest life expectancy in the nation at 81.1 years, while females had the eighth-highest at 83.8.

Education 

The county is served by the Fairfax County Public Schools system, to which the county government allocates 52.2% of its budget. Including state and federal government contributions, along with citizen and corporate contributions, this brings the 2008 budget for the school system to $2.2 billion. The school system has estimated that, based on the 2008 fiscal year budget, the county will be spending $13,407 on each student.

The Fairfax County Public School system contains the Thomas Jefferson High School for Science and Technology, a Virginia Governor's School. TJHSST consistently ranks at or near the top of all U.S. high schools due to the extraordinary number of National Merit Semifinalists and finalists, its students' high average SAT scores, and the number of students who annually perform nationally recognized research in the sciences and engineering. As a Governor's School, TJHSST draws students not only from Fairfax County, but also from Arlington, Loudoun, Fauquier, and Prince William counties, and the City of Falls Church.

Fairfax County is also home to many Catholic elementary and middle schools. The schools fall under the Roman Catholic Diocese of Arlington. The Oakcrest School is a Catholic school in Fairfax County, which is not run by the diocese. Paul VI Catholic High School is Fairfax County's diocese-run Catholic high school.

George Mason University is just outside the city of Fairfax, near the geographic center of Fairfax County. Northern Virginia Community College (NVCC) serves Fairfax County with campuses in Annandale and Springfield and a center in Reston that is a satellite branch of the Loudoun campus. The NVCC Alexandria campus borders Fairfax County. The University of Fairfax is also headquartered in Vienna, Virginia. Virginia Commonwealth University's School of Medicine recently constructed a medical campus wing at Inova Fairfax Hospital in order to allow third- and fourth-year medical students to study at other state-of-the-art facilities in the Northern Virginia region.

Economy 

Fairfax County's economy revolves around professional services and technology. Many residents work for the government or contractors of the federal government. The government is the largest employer, with Fort Belvoir in southern Fairfax the county's single largest source of federal employment. Fairfax County has a gross county product of about $95 billion.

Fairfax County also is home to major employers such as Volkswagen Group of America, Hilton Worldwide, DXC Technology (formerly Computer Sciences Corporation), Northrop Grumman, Science Applications International Corporation (SAIC), Leidos, Booz Allen Hamilton, Gannett, Capital One, General Dynamics, ICF International, Freddie Mac, Sallie Mae, ManTech International, Mars, NII and NVR. The county is home to seven Fortune 500 company headquarters, 11 Hispanic 500 companies, and five companies on the Black Enterprise 500 list.

The county's economy is supported by the Fairfax County Economic Development Authority, which provides services and information to promote Fairfax County as a leading business and technology center. The FCEDA is the nation's largest non-state economic development authority. Fairfax County is also home to the Northern Virginia Technology Council, a trade association for local technology companies. It is the nation's largest technology council, with technology industry figures such as Bill Gates and Meg Whitman speaking at various local banquets. Fairfax County has a higher concentration of high-tech workers than Silicon Valley.

Tysons 

It is the country's 12th-largest business district and is expected to grow substantially in the coming decades. Forbes wrote that the area is "often described as the place where the Internet was invented, but today it looks increasingly like the center of the global military-industrial complex", because it is home to the nation's first ISPs (many now defunct) and attracts numerous defense contractors that have relocated from other states to or near Tysons Corner.

Every weekday, Tysons draws over 100,000 workers from around the region. It also draws 55,000 shoppers every weekday, as it is home to neighboring super-regional malls Tysons Corner Center and Tysons Galleria. In comparison, Washington, D.C., draws 15 million visitors annually, or the equivalent of 62,500 per weekday.

After years of stalling and controversy, the $5.2 billion expansion of the Washington Metro Silver Line in Virginia from Washington, D.C., to Dulles International Airport was funded by the Federal Transit Administration in December 2008. The Silver Line added four stations in Tysons, including a station between Tysons Corner Center and Tysons Galleria.

Along with the expansion of Washington Metro, Fairfax County government has a plan to "urbanize" the Tysons area. The plan calls for a private-public partnership and a grid-like street system to make Tysons a more urban environment, tripling available housing to allow more workers to live near their workplaces. The goal is to have 95% of Tysons Corner within  of a metro station.

Employment 

Fairfax County's average weekly wage during the first quarter of 2005 was $1,181, 52% more than the national average. By comparison, the average weekly wage was $1,286 for Arlington—the Washington metropolitan area's highest—$1,277 for Washington, D.C., and $775 for the U.S. as a whole. The types of jobs available in the area make it very attractive to highly educated workers. The relatively high wages may be partially due to the area's high cost of living.

In early 2005, Fairfax County had 553,107 total jobs, up from 372,792 in 1990. In the area, this is second to Washington's 658,505 jobs in 2005 (down from 668,532 in 1990).

As of the 2002 Economic Census, Fairfax County has the largest professional, scientific, and technical service sector in the Washington, D.C., area—in terms of the number of business establishments; total sales, shipments, and receipts; payrolls; and number of employees—exceeding the next-largest, Washington, D.C., by roughly a quarter overall, and double that of neighboring Montgomery County.

The headquarters of the Central Intelligence Agency (CIA) are in Langley, on Fairfax County's northeastern border.

Top employers 
According to the county's 2021 Comprehensive Annual Financial Report, the county's largest employers are:

Arts and culture 

Annual festivals include the "Celebrate Fairfax!" festival held in June at the Fairfax County Government Center in Fairfax City, the Northern Virginia Fine Arts Festival held in May at the Reston Town Center in Reston, and the International Children's Festival held in September at the Wolf Trap National Park for the Performing Arts, which features a performing arts center outside Vienna.

Fairfax County supports a summer concert series held in multiple venues throughout the county on various nights. The concert series are called Arts in the Parks, Braddock Nights, Lee District Nights, Mt. Vernon Nights, Nottoway Nights, Spotlight by Starlight, Sounds of Summer and Starlight Cinema.

Capital One Hall, which is part of the Capital One Headquarters Complex in Tysons, is a major performing arts center. The space holds performances from a variety of musicians and performing artists across various fields. The Hall opened in 2021 and seats 1,600 in its main theater.

EagleBank Arena (originally the Patriot Center), on the Fairfax campus of George Mason University just outside the City of Fairfax, hosts concerts and shows. The nearby Center for the Arts at George Mason is a major year-round arts venue, and the Workhouse Arts Center in Lorton, Virginia includes studios for artists, event facilities for performing groups, and gallery exhibitions in addition to hosting the annual Clifton Film Festival. Smaller local art venues include:
Alden Theater at the McLean Community Center
ArtSpace Herndon
Center Stage at the Reston Community Center
Greater Reston Arts Center
James Lee Community Center Theater
Vienna Arts Society

Transportation

Roads 

Several major highways run through Fairfax County, including the Capital Beltway (Interstate 495), Interstate 66, Interstate 95, and Interstate 395. The American Legion Bridge connects Fairfax to Montgomery County, Maryland. The George Washington Memorial Parkway, Dulles Toll Road, and Fairfax County Parkway are also major arteries. Other notable roads include Braddock Road, Old Keene Mill Road, Little River Turnpike, State Routes 7, 28, and 123, and U.S. Routes 1, 29, and 50.

The county is in the Washington, D.C., metro area, the nation's third most congested area.
Northern Virginia, including Fairfax County, is the third worst congested traffic area in the nation, in terms of percentage of congested roadways and time spent in traffic. Of the lane miles in the region, 44 percent are rated "F" or worst for congestion. Northern Virginia residents spend an average of 46 hours a year stuck in traffic.

Major highways

Air 

Washington Dulles International Airport lies partly within Fairfax County and provides most air service to the county. Fairfax is also served by two other airports in the Washington area, Ronald Reagan Washington National Airport and Baltimore-Washington International Thurgood Marshall Airport. Manassas Regional Airport, in neighboring Prince William County, is also used for regional cargo and private jet service.

From 1945 to 1961, the eastern part of Fairfax County hosted Falls Church Airpark, an airfield primarily used for general aviation and civil defense purposes until encroaching residential development forced its closure. The area the airport occupied is now mainly used as a shopping center, with the western end of the complex occupied by the Thomas Jefferson branch of the Fairfax County Public Library system. Parts of several apartment complexes are also on some of the airport's former grounds.

Public transportation 

Fairfax County has multiple public transportation services, including the Washington Metro's Orange, Blue, Yellow, and Silver lines. The Silver line, which runs through the Tysons, Reston, and Herndon areas of the county, opened in 2014, later extended in 2022, as the first new Washington Metro line since the Green Line opened in 1991. 

In addition, the VRE (Virginia Railway Express) provides commuter rail service to Union Station in Washington, D.C., with stations in Fairfax County. The VRE's Fairfax County stations are Lorton and Franconia/Springfield on the Fredericksburg line, and Burke Centre, Rolling Road, and Backlick Road on the Manassas line.

Fairfax County contracts its bus service, the Fairfax Connector, to Transdev. The county is also served by WMATA's Metrobus service.

Parks and recreation 
The Fairfax County Park Authority maintains parks and recreation centers through the county. There are also two national protected areas that are inside the county at least in part, including the Elizabeth Hartwell Mason Neck National Wildlife Refuge, the George Washington Memorial Parkway, and Wolf Trap National Park for the Performing Arts. The Mason Neck State Park is also in Lorton.

Fairfax County is a member of the Northern Virginia Regional Park Authority.

The Reston Zoo is in Reston, Virginia. The National Zoo is nearby in Washington, D.C.

Trails 
The county maintains many miles of bike trails running through parks, adjacent to roads and through towns such as Vienna and Herndon. The Washington & Old Dominion Railroad Trail runs through Fairfax County, offering one of the region's best, and safest, routes for recreational walking and biking. In addition, nine miles (14 km) of the Mount Vernon Trail runs through Fairfax County along the Potomac River.

Compared to other regions of the Washington area, Fairfax County has a dearth of designated bike lanes for cyclists wishing to commute in the region. On May 16, 2008, Bike-to-Work Day, the Fairfax County Department of Transportation released the first countywide bicycle route map.

The Fairfax Cross County Trail runs from Great Falls National Park in the county's northern end to Occoquan Regional Park in the southern end. Consisting of mostly dirt paths and short asphalt sections, the trail is used mostly by recreational mountain bikers, hikers, and horse riders.

Communities

Three incorporated towns, Clifton, Herndon, and Vienna, are entirely within Fairfax County.

The independent cities of Falls Church and Fairfax were formed out of areas formerly under Fairfax County's jurisdiction, but are politically separate. Nevertheless, the Postal Service has long considered several portions of Fairfax County to be unincorporated Falls Church and Fairfax City. Several portions of the county also have Alexandria mailing addresses; many locals refer to these neighborhoods collectively as "South Alexandria", "Lower Alexandria", or "Alexandria, Fairfax County". "South Alexandria" communities include Hollin Hills, Franconia, Groveton, Hybla Valley, Huntington, Belle Haven, Mount Vernon, Fort Hunt, Engleside, Burgundy Village, Waynewood, Wilton Woods, Rose Hill, Virginia Hills, Hayfield, and Kingstowne.

It has been proposed to convert the entire county into a single independent city, primarily to gain more control over taxes and roads. The most recent such proposal was made on June 30, 2009.

Other communities in Fairfax County are unincorporated areas. Virginia law dictates that no unincorporated area of a county may be incorporated as a separate town or city following the adoption of the urban county executive form of government. Fairfax County adopted the urban county executive form of government in 1966.

As of the 2000 census, Fairfax County's 13 largest communities are all unincorporated CDPs, the largest of which are Centreville, Reston, and McLean, each with a population over 45,000. (The largest incorporated place in the county is Herndon, its 14th-largest community.)

Census-designated places 

The following localities within Fairfax County are identified by the U.S. Census Bureau as (unincorporated) Census-designated places:

 Annandale
 Bailey's Crossroads
 Belle Haven
 Braddock
 Bull Run
 Burke
 Burke Centre
 Centreville
 Chantilly
 Crosspointe
 Difficult Run
 Dranesville
 Dunn Loring
 Fair Lakes
 Fair Oaks
 Fairfax Station
 Floris
 Fort Belvoir
 Fort Hunt
 Franconia
 Franklin Farm
 George Mason
 Great Falls
 Great Falls Crossing
 Greenbriar
 Groveton
 Hayfield
 Huntington
 Hutchison
 Hybla Valley
 Idylwood
 Kings Park
 Kings Park West
 Kingstowne
 Lake Barcroft
 Laurel Hill
 Lincolnia
 Long Branch
 Lorton
 Mantua
 Mason Neck
 McLean
 McNair
 Merrifield
 Mount Vernon
 Navy
 Newington
 Newington Forest
 North Springfield
 Oakton
 Pimmit Hills
 Ravensworth
 Reston
 Rose Hill
 Seven Corners
 South Run
 Springfield
 Sully Square
 Tysons
 Union Mill
 Wakefield
 West Falls Church
 West Springfield
 Wolf Trap
 Woodburn
 Woodlawn

Other unincorporated communities

Population ranking 
The population ranking of the following table is based on 2020 United States Census Bureau data.

† county seat

Notable people

Sister cities
Fairfax County's sister cities are:
 Songpa (Seoul), South Korea (2009)
 Harbin, China (2009)
 Keçiören (Ankara), Turkey (2012)

See also 

 Fairfax County Chamber of Commerce
 Fairfax County Economic Development Authority
 Fairfax County Fire and Rescue Department
 Fairfax County Police Department
 Fairfax County Sheriff's Office
 List of companies headquartered in Northern Virginia
 List of federal agencies in Northern Virginia
 National Register of Historic Places listings in Fairfax County, Virginia

Notes

External links 

Official Fairfax County sites
 Fairfax County Government website
 Fairfax County Public Schools
 Fairfax County Public Library System
 Property lookup database from the Fairfax County Department of Tax Administration

Other websites
 
 Festival information for Celebrate Fairfax!
 Fairfax County Economic Development Authority
 Fairfax County Chamber of Commerce
 Tourism information from the Fairfax County Convention and Visitors Corporation
 
 

 
Virginia counties
Northern Virginia counties
Virginia counties on the Potomac River
Washington metropolitan area
Populated places established in 1742
1742 establishments in Virginia
Majority-minority counties and independent cities in Virginia